Serajul Islam Choudhury (born 23 June 1936) is a Bangladeshi literary critic, public intellectual, social and political analyst, activist, historian, educationist, editor, translator, columnist, and professor emeritus at the University of Dhaka. He is the editor of Natun Diganta. Considered one of the foremost oppositional intellectuals of Bangladesh, he authored nearly a hundred books and countless essays in Bangla and English.

Early life and education
Choudhury was born in the village of Baroikhali under the Sreenagar thana in the district of Munshigonj. He is the eldest of the nine brothers and four sisters to their parents Hafizuddin Chowdhury and Asia Khatun. In his early life, he liked to build his career as a novelist, but his father wanted him to join the civil service after a degree in Economics. On a note of compromise, he enrolled with the English department at the University of Dhaka after an intermediate of arts degree, obtained in 1952 from Notre Dame College, preceded by his matriculation from St. Gregory's High School in 1950. He received his MA degree in 1956 and taught briefly at Haraganga College in Munshiganj and Jagannath College in Dhaka. He completed his post-graduate diploma in English Studies at The University of Leeds , the UK and obtained his doctorate in English from Leicester University, the UK.

Career
Choudhury joined as a lecturer the Department of English, Dhaka University, in 1957, planning also to be a writer. He decided not to become a bureaucrat which many around him were becoming then. He stated two reasons why he wanted to be a writer: first, his work at the university, which would ensure that he would not be transferred from place to place and which would allow him time to read and write a lot; and, second, his temperament. In more than four decades that followed, he taught students, wrote essays, headed the department, became Dean, spawned off several academic and research projects, initiated doctoral dissertation guidance at the department, started periodicals, founded study centers, and remained involved in university politics.
Choudhury first initiated to offer the Ph.D. degree in English at Dhaka University. He edited journals, the university journals of arts and letters, in Bangla and English — Dhaka Visvavidyalay Patrika for 15 years and Dhaka University Studies for nine years. He founded the Visvavidyalay Patrika. Choudhury also founded a national views weekly called Somoy and co-edited it with Azfar Hussain, Zaheda Ahmad et al, from the early to the mid-1990s. He founded the University Book Centre in 1978 and the Centre for Advanced Research in Humanities in 1986. In keeping with the spirit, he now runs a centre called Samaj Rupantar Adhyayan Kendra (Centre for Social Transformation Studies), which works towards waking people up to a democracy which would mean ‘equality of rights and opportunities. Rights being equal would not mean anything unless the opportunities remain equal.’

Personal life
Choudhury was married to Nazma Jesmin Choudhury. She was a professor the University of Dhaka. Their children are Rownak Ara Choudhury and Sharmin Choudhury.

Awards
 Ekushey Padak
 Bangla Academy Literary Award
 University of Dhaka Gold Medal in Research
 Kazi Mahbubullah Award
 Bangladesh Writers AWard
 Abdur Rahman Choudhury Award

Selected publications
Choudhury's books in the Bengali language: 
Anveshana 
Nirbachita Prabandha (1999)
Rashtra o Samskrti (1993)
Nazrul Islam: Poet and More (1994) [Nazrul Institute]
Bangalir Jaya Parajaya (1994)
Apanajana (1992)

Choudhury's books in the English:

References 

Living people
1936 births
Bangladeshi essayists
Bangladeshi male writers
Bangladeshi Marxists
Bangladeshi translators
Bangladeshi literary critics
Recipients of the Ekushey Padak
University of Dhaka alumni
Academic staff of the University of Dhaka
Alumni of the University of Leicester
Male essayists
Notre Dame College, Dhaka alumni
Recipients of Bangla Academy Award
Bangladeshi political writers